Major General Robert Charles Arthur Glunicke DL (6 March 1886 – 20 October 1963) was a senior Royal Marines officer during the Second World War.

Military career
Born on 6 March 1886, Robert Glunicke was educated at Bedford School. He received his first commission, as a second lieutenant in the Royal Marines in 1904. He served during the First World War and was a member of the East African Expeditionary Force from 1916 to 1917. He served during the Second World War and was Aide-de-camp to King George VI between 1939 and 1940, and Commandant, Plymouth Division, Royal Marines, between 1939 and 1941.

Glunicke retired from the Royal Marines in 1941. He was appointed deputy lieutenant of Bedfordshire on 16 May 1953 and died on 20 October 1963.

References

External links
Generals of World War II
Royal Marine Officers 1939−1945

1886 births
1963 deaths
People educated at Bedford School
Royal Marines generals
Royal Marines generals of World War II
Royal Marines personnel of World War I
Deputy Lieutenants of Bedfordshire